Mamadou Wagué (born 19 August 1990) is a French footballer who plays for Zakho SC as a defender.

Career
Mamadou can play as either a defender or a holding midfielder and joined Le Mans's CFA squad in 2007 after arriving from Paris FC. His performances in the CFA earned him a call up to the senior squad. He made his professional debut on February 7, 2009 in a Ligue 1 match against Toulouse coming on as a substitute in the 80th minute. Le Mans lost the match 0–2. Due to the suspension of defender Grégory Cerdan, Mamadou was called up to the senior squad again, this time for their match against Lille on February 17. On March 6, he agreed to his first professional contract, signing a three-year deal with the club.

On 23 June 2016, Wague signed with Kazakhstan Premier League side FC Zhetysu until the end of the 2016 season.

On 23 July 2020, he signed with the Cypriot club of Alki Oroklini.

On 10 February 2021, he left Cypriot Professionnal League in order to sign in Malaysia Super League club Sri Pahang F.C.

On 30 January 2022, he came back on Iraq Super League for the second time and signs for Zakho SC

Honors
 Winner of the Tournament called " Tournoi International de la Sarthe 2011"
 Champion of Hungary 2013 
 Best defender of Saudi Arabia Premier League 2015-2016
 Best defender of Ukrainian Premier League 2017-2018
 Best Defender of Winter Break in Israel Championship 2019-2020
 Best Defender of Cypriot Premier League 2014-2015

References

External links
 
 LFP Profile

1990 births
Living people
Sportspeople from Saint-Brieuc
French sportspeople of Malian descent
French footballers
Association football defenders
Le Mans FC players
FC Metz players
Debreceni VSC players
Puskás Akadémia FC players
Ethnikos Achna FC players
Najran SC players
Assyriska FF players
FC Zhetysu players
FC Chornomorets Odesa players
Al-Shorta SC players
Maccabi Ahi Nazareth F.C. players
Alki Oroklini players
Ligue 1 players
Ligue 2 players
Nemzeti Bajnokság I players
Cypriot First Division players
Superettan players
Kazakhstan Premier League players
Ukrainian Premier League players
Saudi Professional League players
Liga Leumit players
France youth international footballers
French expatriate footballers
Expatriate footballers in Hungary
Expatriate footballers in Cyprus
Expatriate footballers in Saudi Arabia
Expatriate footballers in Sweden
Expatriate footballers in Kazakhstan
Expatriate footballers in Ukraine
Expatriate footballers in Israel
French expatriate sportspeople in Hungary
French expatriate sportspeople in Cyprus
French expatriate sportspeople in Saudi Arabia
French expatriate sportspeople in Sweden
French expatriate sportspeople in Ukraine
French expatriate sportspeople in Israel
Black French sportspeople
Footballers from Brittany